Amit Shumovich (born July 29, 1992) is an Israeli footballer currently playing for Hapoel Afula, he previously played for Maccabi Netanya.

References

External links
 

1992 births
Living people
Israeli footballers
Maccabi Netanya F.C. players
Hapoel Afula F.C. players
Expatriate soccer players in the United States
Israeli expatriates in the United States
Israeli Premier League players
Liga Leumit players
Association football defenders